Viscoleo is a thin or low-viscosity vegetable oil. It is specifically a proprietary form of fractionated coconut oil and a medium-chain triglyceride (MCT) oil. It is prepared from the dried, solid endosperm of the fruit Cocos nucifera (coconut tree) via hydrolysis, fractionation, and purification. Viscoleo is composed of the medium-chain fatty acids caprylic acid (C8) (55–60%), capric acid (C10) (40%), lauric acid (C12) (1–5%), and caproic acid (C6) (0.5%). It is used as an oil vehicle for several depot antipsychotics including clopentixol decanoate, flupentixol decanoate, pipotiazine palmitate, zuclopentixol acetate, and zuclopentixol decanoate. Injectable antipsychotics using Viscoleo as a carrier may be absorbed more rapidly and have shorter durations than preparations using sesame oil.

References

Vegetable oils